The passerelle Léopold-Sédar-Senghor, formerly known as passerelle Solférino (or pont de Solférino), is a footbridge over the River Seine in the 7th arrondissement of Paris.  It is served by the Metro station Assemblée Nationale.

The first bridges
For a century, a cast iron bridge inaugurated by Napoleon III in 1861 allowed vehicles to cross between quai Anatole-France and quai des Tuileries. Built by the engineers of the Pont des Invalides, Paul-Martin Gallocher de Lagalisserie and Jules Savarin, it was named after the June 1859 French victory of the Battle of Solferino. Having weakened over time (particularly due to barges crashing into it), it was demolished and replaced in 1961 with a steel footbridge, which was demolished in 1992.

The present bridge
 

The new passerelle de Solférino linking the Musée d'Orsay and the Jardin des Tuileries (Tuileries Gardens) was built between 1997 and 1999 under the direction of the engineer and architect Marc Mimram.  Crossing the Seine with a single span and no piers, this metallic bridge is architecturally unique and covered in exotic woods (ipê, a Brazilian tree also used for outdoor flooring at the Bibliothèque nationale de France) which gives it a light and warm appearance.  Its solidity is, however, never in doubt - at either end, its foundations are in the form of concrete pillars extending 15m into the ground, and the structure itself is made up of six 150 tonne components built by the Eiffel engineering company, Eiffel Constructions métalliques.  Its innovative architecture brought Marc Mimram the award "Prix de l'Équerre d'Argent" for the year 1999.

The bridge also has benches and lampposts for promenaders who can reach the Jardin des Tuileries through a subterranean passage on the Rive Droite.

The bridge was renamed after Léopold Sédar Senghor on 9 October 2006 on the centenary of his birth.

References

External links

  Site of Marc Mimram
  Press communiqué on the inauguration in 1999
  Mmairie de Paris site
  Structurae: Passerelle Solférino
  Satellite view on Google Maps
  A Paris, Solférino s'efface au profit de Senghor, article on 20 minutes.

Bridges over the River Seine in Paris
Buildings and structures in the 7th arrondissement of Paris
Arch bridges
Pedestrian bridges in France
1861 establishments in France